Pissa may refer to:

Pissa River, Russia
Pissa, Central African Republic, a village
Pissa or Bisinus (fl. c. 500), king of Thuringia

See also

 
 Pisa (disambiguation)
 Pizza (disambiguation)